Dylan Cunningham (born 22 July 1994 in Philadelphia) is an American professional squash player. As of February 2018, he was ranked number 100 in the world.

References

1994 births
Living people
American male squash players